Beneath the Remains is the third studio album by Brazilian heavy metal band Sepultura, released on April 7, 1989. It was their first release by Roadrunner Records.

The album had improved production and songwriting compared to the band's previous albums. In time it would be acclaimed as a classic in the thrash metal genre. According to vocalist Max Cavalera, Sepultura had "really found [their] style" on that album. In January 2013, Beneath the Remains was inducted into Decibel magazine's Hall of Fame, becoming the second Sepultura album to do so, the first being Roots. This induction would make Sepultura the first band to have more than one of their albums being featured in the Decibel Hall of Fame.

Cover art 
This was their first album to feature a Michael Whelan cover art. There was a bit of controversy surrounding the cover art used for this album. Sepultura had initially planned on using another Michael Whelan cover art, Bloodcurdling Tales of Horror and the Macabre. Igor Cavalera had even gone so far as to get part of the painting tattooed on his arm. However, Roadrunner Records convinced Sepultura to use Nightmare in Red as they felt it was better suited for Beneath the Remains. Monte Conner of Roadrunner later sent the original artwork to Obituary, who used it on their album, Cause of Death, which was released a year after Beneath the Remains. For years after the incident, Igor Cavalera was upset with Monte Conner for giving away their album cover.

Background and recording 
Max Cavalera travelled to New York in February 1988 and spent a whole week negotiating with the Roadrunner label. Although they offered a seven-record deal to Sepultura, the label was unsure of the band's sale potential. The album's budget was a small amount by the label's standards ($8,000), but in the end the cost was almost twice its original budget.

Scott Burns, who had previously engineered records by death metal acts Obituary, Death and Morbid Angel, was the chosen producer. Burns agreed to work for a low fee ($2,000) because he was curious about Brazil. Sepultura spent the last half of December 1988 recording the album at Nas Nuvens Studio in Rio de Janeiro, from 8 pm to 5 am. The studio was specifically chosen because it was the one where some years before Brazilian rock band Titãs had recorded their classic album Cabeça Dinossauro, which impressed Sepultura. Burns had brought some drum equipment and Mesa Boogie amps to Brazil (a rare item for production standards at the time) which helped to improve the sound quality.

Reception 

Beneath the Remains has received critical acclaim. AllMusic writer Eduardo Rivadavia noted that the album "marked the band's transition from third-world obscurity to major contenders in the international extreme metal arena", and called it "the most essential death/thrash metal albums of all time." Adam McCann of Metal Digest called Beneath the Remains a "real heavy metal classic", and wrote "With Beneath the Remains, Sepultura almost drew a line in the sand, they tightened up the sound placed down on their previous album Schizophrenia, amped up the power and created a real beast of an album where not only Sepultura fans hail it to the best Sepultura album ever released, but an album which frequently rides very, very high in the best heavy metal albums ever released. Rightly so too, for Beneath the Remains, all the stars aligned for Sepultura and it lit the blue touch paper that would soon catapult the Brazilians in the heavy metal stratosphere."

Track listing

Personnel 

Sepultura
Max Cavalera – vocals, rhythm guitar
Igor Cavalera – drums, percussion
Andreas Kisser – lead guitar, bass (uncredited)
Paulo Jr. – bass (credited, but did not perform)

Guest musicians
Kelly Shaefer (Atheist) – background vocals on "Stronger Than Hate"
John Tardy (Obituary) – background vocals on "Stronger Than Hate"
Scott Latour (Incubus) – background vocals on "Stronger Than Hate"
Francis Howard (Incubus) – background vocals on "Stronger Than Hate"
Henrique Portugal – synthesizers

Production
Scott Burns – producer, engineer, mixing
Sepultura – production
Max Cavalera – mixing
Monte Conner – executive producer
Antoine Midani – assistant engineer
Tom Morris – mixing at Morrisound Recording, Tampa, Florida, January 1989
Jeff Daniel – producer (reissue)
George Marino – remastering (reissue) at Sterling Sound, New York City
Don Kaye – liner notes (reissue)

Artwork
Michael Whelan – front cover illustration ("Nightmare in Red")
Wesley H. Raffan – back cover photography from lightandshadow.com
Mark Weiss – photography
Eric de Haas – photography
Twelve Point Rule, New York City – album redesign

Chart positions

References 

Works cited
 Anonymous (2003). A Megaton Hit Parade: The All-Time Thrash Top 20. Terrorizer, 109: 34–55.
 Barcinski, André & Gomes, Silvio (1999). Sepultura: Toda a História. São Paulo: Ed. 34. 
 Mudrian, Albert (2009). Precious Metal: Decibel Presents the Stories Behind 25 Extreme Metal Masterpieces, 104.
 Harris, Keith (2000). Roots?: the relationship between the global and the local within the Extreme Metal scene. Popular Music, 19: 13–30.
 Sepultura (1989). Beneath the Remains. [CD]. New York, NY: Roadrunner Records. The Sepultura Remasters (1997).

Sepultura albums
Roadrunner Records albums
Albums produced by Scott Burns (record producer)
1989 albums
Albums with cover art by Michael Whelan